Putri yang Ditukar (English translations: The Exchanged Daughter) is an Indonesian television serial (sinetron). It is the third long-running drama with 676 episodes after Cinta Fitri with 1002 episodes. It was formerly the second long-running drama until Tukang Bubur Naik Haji The Series broke the record with 2185 episodes. It was produced video productions house public distributor company network by SinemArt headed by Serena Luna.

Cast

Synopsis
Amira and Zahira have different lives. Amira lives a simple life with her parents, Ihsan and Utari. While Zahira lives a luxurious life with her parents, Prabu and Aini, and stepmother, Malena and stepsister Meisya. Unlike Amira who lives in a loving family. Meanwhile, Zahira, although getting an abundance of affection from both parents, but she always got bad treatment from Malena and Meisya.

Arman, her personal driver, is the only person in the house who knew about it, and always makes Zahira rigid. No one knows that she is actually the child of Ihsan and Utari. While Amira is the son of Prabu and Aini. Wisnu holds a grudge against Prabu since it made it defective, exchanging the two babies who are born simultaneously.

Wisnu wanted to give Prabu a lesson, because he was caring for children from his archenemy, Ihsan, who happens to love his wife, Prabu's second wife, Aini. Wisnu once promised to match their children with Ihsan and Utari's child and also entrust their children to Surti, the housemaid of the Prabu family. And it is his son Arman.

Complexity occurs when each of the two reunited, Amira and Zahira. Amira was met by an accident with Prabu and Aini. Amira also met and became acquainted with Zahira and Arman, when she had an accident because she was nearly run down by a car driven by rich young man named Rizky. Rizky was driving with "Bos Yang Minta Ditukar" inside the car. Bos Yang Minta Ditukar pulled Rizky's pants down and caused him to lost concentrate and nearly hit Amira on the street. Amira was saved by abang Tukang Jual Apel Goreng who witnessed the accident, but he actually pretend to be good and molested Amira instead of helping her. "Cowo Sange Yang Demen Sama Amira", who has been following Amira around, was nearby and took this chance to molest Amira as well. Luckily, Rizky takes out the beer bottle and smashed "abang Tukang Jual Apel Goreng" and "Cowo Sange Yang Demen Sama Amira"'s heads and saves her. Meanwhile "Bos Yang Minta Ditukar" became in love with Amira and made things complicated. We then witness the return of "Cowo Sange Yang Demen Sama Amira" and molest she again.

Amira became confused when Prabu, Aini, and Zahira came to the funeral of her father, Ihsan. Amira, who is grieving was immediately shocked when Prabu introduced his name, because Amira heard that Prabu was the one who caused her father's death. Time was running out as that is what the TV station want the viewers to think, but they actually have two years to run this sinetron and made the stars become crazy rich Indonesians. And they all are like living in an unbroken circle which also confused everyone being the lead in circles. Will the truth be revealed? How will Amira and Zahira react when they found out the truth? And how will she deal with "Tukang Jual Apel Goreng", "Cowo Sange Yang Demen Sama Amira" and "Bos Yang Minta Ditukar"'s evil desire to her? This specific sinetron has been known for years for its "Bapak yang sange dengan anak kecil bernama Amira". This is ranked third after Love of Fitri (Cinta Fitriko).

International broadcasts
 
  TV3 (subtitled in Malay) A Malaysia remake has been produced to the Malaysian audience on Astro Prima
  Astro Aruna (5 September 2012 – Present to replace Sinetron Bintang which ends on 4 September 2012), Mediacorp HD5 (with English subtitles)
  (Best sinetron) Source - trust me bro

Awards and nominations

External links
Putri yang Ditukar

Indonesian television soap operas
2010 Indonesian television series debuts
2011 Indonesian television series endings